Back in Your Life is the third album by American rock band Jonathan Richman and the Modern Lovers, released in February 1979 by Beserkley Records. Despite being credited to Richman and his backing band, the album only features the backing band on half of the album.

Background
The album marks an experimental venture away from the Modern Lovers' typical rock sound, mostly owing to a new backing band accompanying Richman. The album ventures into genres like doo-wop and children's music.

In 2019, the album was reissued on silver-colored vinyl.

Reception
Stephen Cook of AllMusic called the album "Sweet, fun, and honest", noting Richman's "unbridled enthusiasm, wit, and crack songs".

Smash Hits said, "The world's cleverest clown opts for a cheapo '50s style sound this time out as he jaunts and quavers through this collection with his usual mixture of humour and touching honesty. It's distinctive alright." Robert Christgau said, "I'd say this is great kiddie music--lotsa innocence, lotsa animal songs, even a snot joke."

Track listing
All songs written by Jonathan Richman, unless otherwise noted.

Side one
"Abdul and Cleopatra" – 3:18
"(She's Gonna) Respect Me" – 2:49
"Lover Please" (Billy Swan) – 1:58
"Affection" – 4:06
"Buzz Buzz Buzz" (John Gray, Robert Byrd) – 1:58
"Back in Your Life" – 2:14

Side two
"Party in the Woods Tonight" – 3:01
"My Love Is a Flower (Just Beginning to Bloom)" – 2:20
"I'm Nature's Mosquito" – 2:45
"Emaline" (Traditional; arranged by Jonathan Richman) – 2:07
"Lydia" (Lewis Lymon, Morgan Robinson) – 3:11
"I Hear You Calling Me" (music: Charles Marshall; lyrics: Harold Harford) – 2:52

2004 CD bonus tracks
"Oh Carol" (Chuck Berry) – 2:27
"Astral Plane" (Live) – 3:42
"Hospital" (Live) – 5:19
"Chapel of Love" (Jeff Barry, Ellie Greenwich, Phil Spector) – 2:43

Personnel
Jonathan Richman and the Modern Lovers
Jonathan Richman – vocals, guitar
Leroy Radcliffe – guitar, vocals (tracks 1, 3–5, 8, 10–12)
David Sharpe – drums, percussion, vocals (tracks 1, 3–5, 8, 10–12)
Asa Brebner – bass guitar, vocals (tracks 1, 3–5, 8, 10–12)

Additional musicians 
Peter Skip Duelks – backing vocals (tracks 2, 6, 7, 9)
Donald Gladstone – double bass  (tracks 2, 6, 7, 9)
Kenny Laguna – glockenspiel, backing vocals (tracks 2, 6, 7, 9)
Andy Paley – guitar, backing vocals (tracks 2, 6, 7, 9)
Steve Tracey – backing vocals (tracks 2, 6, 7, 9)

Technical
Glen Kolotkin – producer, engineer
Matthew King Kaufman – producer
Kenny Laguna – producer
Steve Kimball – mastering
Flashing Neon – LP concept
Linda Dennis – cover art
Jonathan Richman – cover art
Nina Port – art direction

References

1979 albums
Jonathan Richman albums